Leigh Anne Tuohy (née Roberts; born August 9, 1960) is an American businesswoman and interior designer. She is the adoptive mother of Michael Oher. Their story was featured in the 2006 book The Blind Side: Evolution of a Game and its 2009 feature film adaptation The Blind Side. In the film, Tuohy was portrayed by Sandra Bullock, who won an Academy Award and a Golden Globe Award for her performance.

Early life
She was born in Memphis, Tennessee, the daughter of Virginia (née Cummings 1939-2018) and Stanley Roberts. Growing up, she was close to her maternal grandmother, Virginia "Virgie" (Collins) Cummings, who lived with her family. She graduated from Briarcrest Christian School in Memphis, Tennessee. In the early 1980s, she graduated from University of Mississippi, where she became a member of the Kappa Delta sorority, was a cheerleader, and met her future husband, Sean Tuohy, a basketball player for the Ole Miss Rebels.

Career
Tuohy and her husband once owned 115 fast food franchises of Taco Bell and Kentucky Fried Chicken, but  owned 11, having sold the majority in six separate transactions.

Tuohy is an interior designer. In 2010, she was named one of three new design team members for ABC's Extreme Makeover: Home Edition.

Tuohy and her husband are also the co-authors of the book In a Heartbeat: Sharing the Power of Cheerful Giving, which was published in 2010.

Personal life
Tuohy married her husband Sean Tuohy in 1982. They have three children. Their adopted son Michael Oher is a former National Football League offensive lineman. Their daughter Collins Tuohy was a state champion pole vaulter and a cheerleader at the University of Mississippi. Their son Sean "SJ" Tuohy, Jr. played basketball for the Loyola Greyhounds. Tuohy and her husband live in Memphis, Tennessee.

Tuohy gave the commencement address at Christian Brothers University on May 14, 2010. She also received an honorary degree from the university during its commencement ceremony for her commitment to the less fortunate and her ongoing quest to recruit others to make a difference.

References

External links 
 
  - archived old website

1960 births
Living people
People from Memphis, Tennessee
University of Mississippi alumni
American interior designers
Tuohy family